Björn Andersson (born 20 July 1951) is a Swedish former professional footballer who played as a defender. He is best remembered for representing Bayern Munich and was part of their European Cup victory in 1975. A full international between 1972 and 1977, he won 28 caps and scored one goal for the Sweden national football team and represented his country in the 1974 FIFA World Cup.

He is currently a youth coordinator at IS Halmia.

Honours
Bayern Munich
 European Cup: 1974–75, 1975–76
 Intercontinental Cup: 1976

References

External links
 
 

1951 births
Living people
People from Perstorp Municipality
Swedish footballers
Association football defenders
Östers IF players
FC Bayern Munich footballers
Bundesliga players
Allsvenskan players
UEFA Champions League winning players
Sweden international footballers
1974 FIFA World Cup players
Swedish expatriate footballers
Swedish expatriate sportspeople in Germany
Expatriate footballers in West Germany
FC Bayern Munich non-playing staff
Footballers from Skåne County
Swedish expatriate sportspeople in West Germany